The Last Hunt is a 1956 American Western film directed by Richard Brooks and produced by Dore Schary. The screenplay was by Richard Brooks from the novel The Last Hunt, by Milton Lott. The music score was by Daniele Amfitheatrof and the cinematography by Russell Harlan.

The film stars Robert Taylor and Stewart Granger, with Lloyd Nolan, Debra Paget and Russ Tamblyn.

Plot
Sandy McKenzie (Stewart Granger) sets out on his last hunt with his new partner, the obsessive Charles Gilson (Robert Taylor). While McKenzie has grown tired of buffalo hunting, Gilson derives a pleasure from his "stands" – killing an entire herd of buffalo at one time. When Gilson chases down and kills an Indian raiding party, he takes an Indian woman and her child captive. The presence of the native woman causes tension and Gilson becomes increasingly paranoid and deranged, leading to a stand-off between the two former partners.

In the final scene, McKenzie and the woman emerge from shelter to find that Gilson, though wearing a buffalo hide as protection from the cold, has frozen to death during the night, while waiting to ambush them.

Cast
 Robert Taylor as Charles Gilson
 Stewart Granger as Sandy McKenzie 
 Lloyd Nolan as Woodfoot
 Debra Paget as Indian Girl
 Russ Tamblyn as Jimmy O'Brien
 Constance Ford as Peg
 Joe DeSantis as Ed Black
 Ainslie Pryor as First Buffalo Hunter
 Ralph Moddy as Indian Agent
 Fred Graham as Bartender
 Ed Lonehill as Spotted Hand
 Roy Barcroft as Major Smith (uncredited)

Original novel
The New York Times said "except for A.B. Guthrie's "The Big Sky" and "The Way West" I can think of no novel about the Old West published within the last fifteen years as good as "The Last Hunt", by Milton Lott. This is the real thing, a gritty, tough, exciting story reeking with the pungent smells of dead buffalo and of dirty men." W.R. Burnett called it an "undeniably able and interesting book."

Development
MGM bought the film rights and announced it as a vehicle for Stewart Granger in February 1955. "It's real Americana", said the star. Richard Brooks was assigned the job of adapting and directing. The film was the first of only three westerns directed by Brooks, and was his first film following the critically acclaimed Blackboard Jungle (1955).

In March Robert Taylor was announced as co-star. Russ Tamblyn was then given the lead support part as a half Indian.

Lloyd Nolan was also cast – his first film role in over a year and a half, during which time he had played The Caine Mutiny Court Martial on stage. Anne Bancroft was cast as the Indian girl.

Production
Eighty percent of the movie was shot on location over a seven-week period. This took place at the Badlands National Park and Custer State Park in South Dakota during the then-annual "thinning" of the buffalo herd.

Actual footage of buffalo being shot and killed (by government marksmen) was used for the film. Harvey Lancaster of Custer was the main marksman for the filming.

The story takes place during the winter but was actually filmed during the scorching summer months in Custer State Park. When temperatures reached triple digits, Stewart Granger, whose costume consisted of full winter clothing, passed out from heat exhaustion and the crew had to cut away his clothes to revive him.

Granger and director Brooks were reportedly not fond of one another, especially after Brooks married Granger's ex-wife, Jean Simmons.

After three weeks of filming, Anne Bancroft was injured during filming after falling from a horse. She was replaced by Debra Paget.

During filming Dore Schary announced Taylor and Granger would be reteamed in another western, The Return of Johnny Burro with Granger playing a villain and Taylor a hero. However the film was not made.

Reception

Box office
The film earned $1,750,000 in North American rental during its first year of release.  It recorded admissions of 1,201,326 in France.

According to MGM records, the film earned $1,604,000 in the US and Canada and $1,379,000 overseas, resulting in a loss of $323,000.

"The public couldn't stand it", said Brooks. "In England most of the scenes with the buffalo were cut out. In the States they couldn't stand it because of their own guilt... I learnt something very valuable: when you deal with a subject that is traditional, don't deny it to the public... If you want to do the real thing, the way the West really was, do it on a small budget and don't expect any miracles."

Comic book adaptation
 Dell Four Color #678 (February 1956)

See also
List of American films of 1956

References

External links

Review at Variety

1956 films
Metro-Goldwyn-Mayer films
CinemaScope films
Films based on American novels
Films based on Western (genre) novels
Films directed by Richard Brooks
1950s English-language films
1956 Western (genre) films
Films about hunters
Films adapted into comics
Films scored by Daniele Amfitheatrof
American Western (genre) films
Revisionist Western (genre) films
1950s American films